Baladiyah al-Shifa, officially the Al-Shifa Sub-Municipality is a baladiyah and one of the 14 sub-municipalities of Riyadh, Saudi Arabia. It includes 8 neighborhoods and is responsible for their development, planning and maintenance.

Neighborhoods and districts 

 Al-Masani
 Al-Shifa
 Badr
 Al-Marwah
 Al-Okaz
 Ahad
 Al-Arayiz
 Al-Mansouriyah

References 

Shifa